HMCS Athabaskan was a  destroyer that served with the Royal Canadian Navy in the immediate post-Second World War era. She was the second destroyer to bear the name "Athabaskan", after the many tribes throughout western Canada that speak Athabaskan family languages. Both this ship and the original  were destroyers and thus this one became known as Athabaskan II.

Built too late to see action in the North Atlantic, Athabaskan II  served in the Korean War and played an important role in Canadian postwar naval reform following a crew protest in 1949.

Construction and career
Athabaskan was ordered in April 1942. She was laid down 15 May 1943 at Halifax Shipyards and launched 4 May 1946. She was one of four Tribal-class destroyers built in Halifax during the Second World War. She was commissioned into the Royal Canadian Navy on 20 January 1948 at Halifax.

After commissioning, Athabaskan sailed for the west coast to begin her career as a training ship. She performed this task until the outbreak of the Korean War. It was during this period that the mutiny took place.

1949 'mutiny'

On 26 February 1949, when the Athabaskan was on fueling stop at Manzanillo, Colima, Mexico, ninety leading seamen and below – constituting more than half the ship's company – locked themselves in their messdecks, and refused to come out until getting the captain to hear their grievances.

The captain acted with great sensitivity to defuse the crisis, entering the mess for an informal discussion of the sailors' grievances and carefully avoiding using the term "mutiny" which could have had severe legal consequences for the sailors involved. Specifically, while talking with the disgruntled crew members, the captain is known to have placed his cap over a written list of demands which could have been used as legal evidence of a mutiny, pretending not to notice it. Years later, one of her crew suggested that one specific grievance involved the lack of rum rations, a tradition which continued until 1970.

Korean War

Athabaskan operated during the Korean War, earning the battle honour "Korea 1950–53"

Return to training role
Following Korea, Athabaskan underwent a major refit, recommissioning on 25 October 1954 as a destroyer escort. On 1 January 1955, Athabaskan was assigned to the Second Canadian Escort Squadron of Pacific Command. In November 1955, the Second Canadian Escort Squadron was among the Canadian units that took part in one of the largest naval exercises since the Second World War off the coast of California. She returned to her training mission which lasted until January 1959. That month, she transferred to the east coast where she became part of the destroyer squadron made up of the Tribal-class destroyers in the Royal Canadian Navy. She spent the next five years on training cruises with occasional North Atlantic Treaty Organization (NATO) exercises. Athabaskan was placed in reserve in 1964 at Halifax.

Decommissioning and fate
Athabaskan was paid off for disposal on 21 April 1966. She was sold in 1969 and scrapped in 1970 at La Spezia, Italy.

Notes

References

External links

 

Tribal-class destroyers (1936) of the Royal Canadian Navy
Cold War destroyers of Canada
Ships built in Nova Scotia
Naval mutinies
1945 ships
Korean War destroyers of Canada